James Walter Grimston, 1st Earl of Verulam (26 September 1775 – 17 November 1845), styled Lord Dunboyne from 1775 until 1808 and known as the 4th Viscount Grimston from 1808 to 1815, was a British peer and politician.

Life and career

He was the son of James Grimston, 3rd Viscount Grimston of Gorhambury House and Harriot Walter.

In 1802 he was elected to the House of Commons for St Albans, a seat he held until 1808, when he succeeded his father as fourth Viscount Grimston and second Baron Verulam and entered the House of Lords. The latter year, he also succeeded his maternal cousin as tenth Lord Forrester.

In 1815 he was created Viscount Grimston and Earl of Verulam in the Peerage of the United Kingdom. He later held the honorary post of Lord Lieutenant of Hertfordshire from 1823 to 1845.

Marriage and issue
In 1807, he married Lady Charlotte Jenkinson, daughter of Charles Jenkinson, 1st Earl of Liverpool. They had six sons and four daughters, and all of their daughters married earls:

 James Walter Grimston, 2nd Earl of Verulam (Feb. 22, 1809  –1895)
 Lady Katherine Grimston (April 18, 1810 – 1874), married in 1834 John Foster-Barham (d. 1838), married in 1839 George Villiers, 4th Earl of Clarendon
 Edward Harbottle Grimston (Aug. 2, 1812–1881)
 Henry Luckyn Grimston (August 1813 - 1814, young)
 Lady Emily Mary Grimston (Feb. 14, 1816–1901), married William Craven, 2nd Earl of Craven
 Robert Grimston (Sept. 18, 1816–1884)
 Capt. Charles Grimston (Oct. 3, 1818–1857), Coldstream Guards
 Lady Mary Augusta Frederica Grimston (July 29, 1821 – 1879), married Jacob Pleydell-Bouverie, 4th Earl of Radnor
 Rev. Francis Sylvester Grimston (Dec. 8, 1823–1865), married Katherine Morier and had issue
 Lady Jane Frederica Harriet Mary Grimston (Jan. 17, 1825–1888), married James Alexander, 3rd Earl of Caledon

Lord Verulam died in November 1845, aged 70, and was succeeded in his titles by his eldest son James. Lady Verulam died in 1863.

Notes

References

Kidd, Charles, Williamson, David (editors). Debrett's Peerage and Baronetage (1990 edition). New York: St Martin's Press, 1990,

External links

1775 births
1845 deaths
Alumni of Christ Church, Oxford
1
James
Lord-Lieutenants of Hertfordshire
Dunboyne, James Grimston, Lord
Dunboyne, James Grimston, Lord
Dunboyne, James Grimston, Lord
Dunboyne, James Grimston, Lord
UK MPs who inherited peerages
UK MPs who were granted peerages
Tory MPs (pre-1834)
Presidents of the Marylebone Cricket Club